To Live and Die and Live is a 2023 American drama film written and directed by Qasim Basir and starring Amin Joseph.

Cast
Amin Joseph as Muhammad Abdullah
Skye P. Marshall
Omari Hardwick
Cory Hardrict
Maryam Basir
Dana Gourrier
Travina Springer
Ismail Abdul-Aziz
Jeryl Prescott
Roger Guenveur Smith

Release
The film premiered at the Sundance Film Festival on January 20, 2023.

Reception
The film has a 100% rating on Rotten Tomatoes based on six reviews.

Dennis Harvey of Variety gave the film a positive review and wrote, "For all its tastefully exasperating gaps in character and storytelling specifics, To Live & Die and Live still has a persuasive overall vision..." Patrice Witherspoon of Screen Rant awarded the film four out of five stars and wrote, "In its methodical approach towards addressing mental health, To Live and Die and Live defies and exceeds emotional expectations." Todd McCarthy of Deadline Hollywood also gave the film a positive review and wrote, "Stylistically, To Live and Die and Live is cut down to the bone, with the essential action being conveyed but with a vital terseness that both frustrates and keeps you on your toes."

References

External links